Cymothoe caenis, the common glider, is a species of butterfly of the family Nymphalidae. It is found in Guinea, Sierra Leone, Liberia, Ivory Coast, Ghana, Togo, southern Nigeria, Cameroon, the Republic of the Congo, the Central African Republic, Angola, the Democratic Republic of the Congo, Uganda, Tanzania and Zambia. The habitat consists of forests and heavy woodland. It is a migratory species.

The larvae feed on Rawsonia usambarensis, Rawsonia lucida, Caloncoba gilgiana, Caloncoba glauca, Oncoba spinosa, Oncoba welwitschii, Lindackeria and Uapaca species.

References

Butterflies described in 1773
Cymothoe (butterfly)
Butterflies of Africa
Taxa named by Dru Drury